Maria Thins (c. 1593 – 27 December 1680) was the mother-in-law of Johannes Vermeer and a member of the Gouda Thins family.

Life
Maria was born in Gouda.  In 1622 she married Reynier Bolnes, a prominent and prosperous brickmaker. In 1635 the marriage deteriorated; her sister found her crying in bed after her husband had beaten her. The couple moved to another house, where Wouter Crabeth had lived. There Bolnes had his dinner in the front room, together with his son, while he refused to talk to her and slept in a room upstairs. At one time her daughter Cornelia was locked up by her father and in 1641 Maria Thins decided to move to Delft, where her brother lived. Her husband refused to divorce her, but in 1649 she received a considerable sum of money from him.

Her daughter Cornelia died in 1643. 
In 1653 her daughter Catharina married Johannes Vermeer in Schipluiden but it is not exactly known when the couple moved in at her rather spacious house on Oude Langendijk. Vermeer had his atelier on the front side of the second floor.

Maria Thins apparently played an important role in their life. She was a devotee of the Jesuit order in the nearby Catholic Church, and this seems to have influenced Johannes and Catharina too. Their third son was called Ignatius, after the founder of the Jesuit Order. It is not known if the children were baptized in the Catholic Church, because baptismal records from that period are no longer extant.

In 1664 her son Willem, a jobless bachelor, was locked up in an institution after an argument with his mother, and for attacking his pregnant sister with a stick. In 1665 Maria Thins was entrusted with her son's property. She was not required by law to limit his share to the legal minimum, but she mentioned that he had been calling her names since his youth.

In 1672 Maria Thins got into financial difficulties: her land near Schoonhoven was flooded to prevent the French army crossing the Dutch Water Line. In 1675 Vermeer went on several business trips for his mother-in-law, first to Gouda, when her husband had died, and then to Amsterdam. There Vermeer borrowed money by fraudulently using her name. Shortly thereafter Vermeer suffered what was referred to as a "frenzy", in the words of his wife, from which he died. She attributed this to stress caused by all their financial difficulties. After Vermeer's death, Maria Thins stated that she used her income to help support the struggling painter and his growing family. For her help she received The Art of Painting, one of the finest, most mysterious and famous paintings in the history of Western Art. In 1676 she lived in the Hague but moved back to Delft where, upon her death, she was buried in the Protestant Old Church on 27 December 1680, next to Vermeer and her son Willem. The burial record states that she died as the widow of Rijnier Bolnes. Her daughter Catharina moved to Breda. Catharina Bollenes (Bolnes) received "Holy Oil", according to the records of the Roman Catholic parish of St Joseph, before being buried on 30 December 1687.

References

External links
 http://www.encyclopedia.com/doc/1G1-17942747.html
 http://www.vermeerscamera.co.uk/reply4.htm
 http://www.bergerfoundation.ch/

Johannes Vermeer
People from Delft
People from Gouda, South Holland
1680 deaths
1590s births
Dutch Roman Catholics